Ramon Jolo "Jolo" Bautista Revilla III (born Jose Lorenzo Hernandez Bautista III; March 15, 1988) is a Filipino actor, comedian, and politician serving as the representative of the 1st District of Cavite since 2022. He also served as the vice governor of Cavite from 2013 until 2022.

Background

Early life
Revilla was born as Jose Lorenzo Hernandez Bautista III on March 15, 1988 to actors Bong Revilla and Lani Mercado.

Political career
During the barangay elections on October 25, 2010, Revilla ran as Barangay Captain of Panapaan VII in Bacoor, Cavite and was elected. He later became the President of the Association of Barangay Captains in Cavite, which automatically landed him a seat as an ex-officio board member in the Sangguniang Panlalawigan (Provincial Council).

He ran for vice governor of Cavite in the 2013 elections, with incumbent Governor Jonvic Remulla as his running mate. Together, they beat the rival tandem of Ronald Jay Lacson, son of Senator Panfilo Lacson, and former Governor Ayong Maliksi, respectively. At the age of 25, he became the youngest ever to be elected vice governor of Cavite, a distinction later broken by his successor Athena Tolentino, who was 24 when she took office in 2022.

In 2022, he ran for representative of the 1st district of Cavite. He defeated former Kawit Vice Mayor Paul Abaya in the elections, ending the 28-year rule of the Abayas in the district.

Entertainment career
He is notable for playing the role of Ramon Salcedo in the 2008 TV series remake of Kaputol ng Isang Awit. Revilla originally signed to GMA Network but later transferred to its rival network ABS-CBN. In 2009, he took the lead role in the TV series remake of Pepeng Agimat, which was originally topbilled by his grandfather Ramon Revilla Sr.

Personal life
Revilla is married to Binibining Pilipinas 2016 1st Runner-up Angelica Alita. They married in a Christian wedding ceremony in California, USA in 2019. He has one son with former girlfriend Grace Adriano, daughter of actress Rosanna Roces, named Jose Gabriel Adriano Bautista IV (born January 13, 2006).

Alleged shooting attempt
On February 28, 2015, Revilla was cleaning his Glock semi-automatic pistol when he sustained an accidental self-inflicted gunshot wound at his father's residence in Ayala Alabang and was rushed to the Asian Hospital and Medical Center in Muntinlupa. Revilla was under observation for a time until March 28 when he resumed his duties. According to his mother's talent manager, Lolit Solis, Revilla had been suffering from depression. He said in an interview with Startalk that it was a "simple, pure accident."

Filmography

Television

Film

References

External links
 

1988 births
Living people
Filipino male child actors
People from Bacoor
Male actors from Cavite
People from Quezon City
Male actors from Metro Manila
Jolo
Lakas–CMD politicians
GMA Network personalities
ABS-CBN personalities
Star Magic
Members of the Cavite Provincial Board
Filipino actor-politicians
20th-century Filipino male actors
21st-century Filipino male actors